Santa Teresita is a district of the Turrialba canton, in the Cartago province of Costa Rica.

History 
Santa Teresita was created on 11 June 1968 by Decreto Ejecutivo 20. Segregated from Peralta.

Geography 
Santa Teresita has an area of  km² and an elevation of  metres.

Demographics 

For the 2011 census, Santa Teresita had a population of  inhabitants.

Transportation

Road transportation 
The district is covered by the following road routes:
 National Route 415

Tourism
The Guayabo National Monument is located between this district and Santa Cruz district, both in Turrialba canton.

References 

Districts of Cartago Province
Populated places in Cartago Province